Chuang Chia-jung and Liang Chen were the defending champions, but chose not to participate together. Chuang played alongside Darija Jurak, but lost in the semifinals to María Irigoyen and Liang.
Anabel Medina Garrigues and Arantxa Parra Santonja won the title, defeating Irigoyen and Liang in the final, 6–2, 6–0.

Seeds

Draw

References
 Main Draw

Internationaux de Strasbourgandnbsp;- Doubles
2016 Doubles
Internationaux de Strasbourg